Kim Chaek (14 August 1903 – 31 January 1951) was a North Korean revolutionary, military general, and politician. His real name was Kim Hong-gye.

Life 

Kim Chaek was born in Sŏngjin, North Hamgyong, Korea, in 1903. He and his family fled to Manchuria after Korea was colonized by Japan. In 1927, Kim joined the Communist Party of China and the Anti-Japanese movement to oppose the Japanese occupation. He was imprisoned for his resistance activities. After his release from prison, Kim joined the Northeast Anti-Japanese United Army in 1935 and fought alongside Kim Il-sung. He fled to the Soviet Union to escape the Japanese conquest of the partisans in 1940. He lived in Khabarovsk where he met with Kim Il-sung and formed the 88th Special Brigade. After the Soviet invasion of Manchuria, he returned to Korea along with the Soviet Army in 1945. On September 9, 1948, the Democratic People’s Republic of Korea was established, Kim became the industry minister and deputy prime minister under Kim Il-sung. He was appointed number 2 Committee Vice Chairman in the Workers' Party of Korea. In the Korean War, he was a commander of the North Korean troops on the front lines.

A Japanese history of the Kim Il-sung family claims that Kim Chaek was purged when he was found responsible for the failure at the Inchon landing, and died in January 1951 after an American military air raid bombing or was assassinated following a power struggle. Kim Il-sung's memoir With the Century states instead that Kim died of heart failure after a long night of work.

Posthumous honours

After his death, Kim Chaek's birthplace Haksong County, combined with the neighboring city of Songjin, was formally renamed to Kim Chaek City to commemorate his life and accomplishments. Kim Chaek University of Technology in Pyongyang and Kim Chaek Iron and Steel Complex in Chongjin are also named after him.

He was awarded North Korea's National Reunification Prize in 1998.

Work 
 Feature-length epic "Mt. Paektu" 《장편 대서사시 백두산》

References

Korea, a century of change by Jürgen Kleiner page 275
Korea Web Weekly Remembering Kim Chaik
Kim Jong Il Biography.  Pyongyang: Foreign Languages Publishing House for Literature, 2005.

1903 births
1951 deaths
People from Kimchaek
Government ministers of North Korea
North Korean generals
North Korean military personnel of the Korean War
Recipients of the National Reunification Prize
Members of the 1st Central Committee of the Workers' Party of North Korea
Members of the 2nd Central Committee of the Workers' Party of Korea
Members of the 2nd Political Committee of the Workers' Party of Korea
Members of the 2nd Standing Committee of the Workers' Party of Korea
Members of the 1st Supreme People's Assembly
People of 88th Separate Rifle Brigade